Cindy Rakowitz is an American executive, known as a public relations expert and as a former Division President for Playboy Enterprises, where she ran international public relations, marketing and advertising, as well as the modeling agency for over 15 years.

Playboy
Between the years 1986 and 2001, Cindy Rakowitz managed Playboy's policies in the fields of public relations, marketing and advertising, also representing the company as spokesperson in relation to the major media outlets. She was involved in the development of Playboy brand and its related trademarks and logos, she advised the celebrities who had a relationship with Playboy, voiced Playboy's views on various issues and produced Playboy's major events. Cindy worked on a daily basis with Playboy founder Hugh M. Hefner, in the strategic planning of his Mansion parties and representing him as a spokesperson.

She served on the board of the Playboy Foundation and became involved in AIDS research and education (she helped and supported Rebekka Armstrong when she came out as HIV-positive and became one of the best-known public faces of heterosexual HIV transmission).

Considering an independent career, Cindy Rakowitz left the company in 2001, after negotiating the terms of a four-month notice. It was at that time that the internet became a popular vehicle for adult entertainment and Playboy began providing these users with harder core sexual programming.

BR Public Relations

After leaving Playboy Enterprises, Cindy Rakowitz started her own media and entertainment company in Los Angeles, named RNR Entertainment, then she co-founded, together with Diane Blackman, Blackman Rakowitz Public Relations (known as BR Public Relations). She planned and executed brand strategies for major companies, establishing luxury brands, like Patrón tequila or Dermalogica skincare. In Patrón tequila's case, the media strategy changed perceptions about tequila, producing positive media coverage after securing endorsements from celebrities like Jamie Foxx and Kevin Costner or after featuring it as the choice of Tom Cruise's character in Vanilla Sky.

Media

Cindy Rakowitz hosts Stars of PR on VoiceAmerica Radio, a live weekly radio program devoted to public relations and marketing. She appears in other media as a public relations consultant, with opinions about the image of various public figures. As a media trainer, she is known for her ability to advise her clients how to deal with the press during unanticipated crises. She received certification from Harvard Law's Disputes Program in 1993.

She is involved in social media advocacy, as a speaker on marketing through social media platforms and as the editor of ProVisors' newsletter Trusted Advisor.

Writer

In 2012, she published Emergency Public Relations: Crisis Management In a 3.0 World (co-authored with Alan B. Bernstein), a book on crisis management issues and rapid responses to public relation emergencies.

Fit 4 The Cause

Cindy Rakowitz initiated Fit 4 The Cause, a Thousand Oaks based non-profit organization raising funds for health related causes through group fitness programs performed in unexpected venues, such as malls, parks, corporate suites, hotels, rooftops and health clubs. Until 2012, she participated in group exercise programs as a hobby, then she became more interested in the fitness lifestyle and its effects on physical and mental well-being. In February 2013, she was licensed by the American Counsel on Exercise certification and began working as a Group Fitness Instructor.

References

External links
Profile at BR Public Relations

American public relations people
Playboy people
Queens College, City University of New York alumni
Living people
Year of birth missing (living people)